The 1976 Virginia Slims of Detroit  was a women's tennis tournament played on indoor carpet courts at the Cobo Hall & Arena  in Detroit, Michigan in the United States that was part of the 1976 Virginia Slims World Championship Series. It was the fifth edition of the tournament and was held from February 17 through February 22, 1976. First-seeded Chris Evert won the singles title and earned $15,000 first-prize money.

Finals

Singles
 Chris Evert defeated  Rosemary Casals 6–4, 6–2
 It was Evert's 3rd singles title of the year and the 58th of her career.

Doubles
 Mona Guerrant /  Ann Kiyomura defeated  Chris Evert /  Betty Stöve 6–3, 6–4

Prize money

References

Virginia Slims of Detroit
Virginia Slims of Detroit
1976 in sports in Michigan
February 1976 sports events in the United States